Enrique Padilla may refer to:

 Enrique Padilla (polo) (1890–?), Argentine polo player
 Enrique Padilla (pentathlete) (born 1934), Mexican modern pentathlete